= Committee on the Militia =

Committee on the Militia may refer to:

- United States House Committee on the Militia
- United States Senate Committee on the Militia
